White magic is magic used for benevolent purposes.

White Magic may also refer to:

 White Magic (band), an American rock band
 White Magic, a 2010 album by Swedish musician ceo
 Kirk Stevens, a snooker player nicknamed "white magic"
 Lacey, a professional wrestler who has also performed under the ring name White Magic
 WhiteMagic, a display technology
 Mephedrone, a drug also known as "white magic"